The discography of The Waifs, an Australian folk rock band, consists of eight studio albums, five singles, one EP, and two live albums.

Albums

Studio albums

Live albums

Singles

References

General
 
 
 
 

Specific

External links

Discography
Waifs, The
Folk music discographies
Rock music group discographies